is a national highway connecting Nagoya, Aichi Prefecture, and Toyama, Toyama Prefecture, Japan. The bulk of the road run throughs Gifu Prefecture. The route is also referred to as Yon-ichi and Shippin, based on the Japanese readings for the route numbering.

The road generally follows the route of JR Central's Takayama Main Line, except for a few locations around the cities of Takayama and Hida. The northern part of the route is generally used for sightseeing and the southern part is for industry. As a result, the northern areas are generally crowded only on weekends and holidays, whereas the southern areas, especially around Nagoya, have high traffic volume every day.

Route data

Length: 
Origin: Higashi-ku, Nagoya, Aichi Prefecture (originates at junction with Route 19)
Terminus: Toyama, Toyama Prefecture (ends at junction with Route 8)
Major cities: Minokamo, Gero, Takayama

History
Route 41 was originally designated on 18 May 1953 as National Route 155, and this was redesignated as Route 41 when the route was promoted to a Class 1 highway.

Overlapping sections
In Minokamo, from Ota-honmachi-4 intersection to Shin-Ota-bashi intersection: Route 21
In Minokamo, from Shimamachi intersection to Mikadocho intersection: Route 248

Municipalities passed through
Aichi Prefecture
Nagoya, Toyoyama, Komaki, Ōguchi, Fusō, Inuyama
Gifu Prefecture
Kani, Minokamo, Kawabe, Hichisō, Yaotsu, Shirakawa, Gero, Takayama, Hida
Toyama Prefecture
Toyama

Intersects with

Aichi Prefecture
Route 19 (at the origin)
Route 302 (Nagoya's Higashi-ku)
Route 155 (Komaki)
Gifu Prefecture
Route 21 and 248 (Minokamo)
Route 418 (Kawabe)
Route 256 (Kawabe, Gero)
Route 257 (Gero)
Route 158 (Takayama)
Route 472 (Takayama, Hida)
Route 471 (Hida)
Toyama Prefecture
Route 359 and 360 (Toyama)
Route 8 (at the terminus)

See also

References

041
Roads in Aichi Prefecture
Roads in Gifu Prefecture
Roads in Toyama Prefecture